Lineodes integra, the eggplant leafroller moth or nightshade leaftier, is a moth of the family Crambidae. It is found from the southern United States (from Florida to California), south to Chile. It has also been recorded from Illinois, Michigan, Ontario and Cuba.

The wingspan is about 18 mm. The forewings are light brown with a dark brown arc which starts at the inner margin and ends in the subterminal area. There is a dark brown semicircular patch along the costa near the apex, which is outlined in white. The hindwings are greyish brown.

The larvae feed on Solanaceae species, including Solanum melongena, Physalis species, Capsicum species, Solanum viarum and Solanum lycopersicum.

References

Moths described in 1873
Spilomelinae